"What Will I Do" is a single released by freestyle singer Timmy T from his 1990 album Time After Time. It reached No. 96 on the U.S. Billboard Hot 100 chart on July 28, 1990.

Track listing

Charts

References

1990 singles
Timmy T songs
Quality Records singles
1990 songs